All the Indonesia navy (Indonesian: Tentara Nasional Indonesia-Angkatan Laut, TNI-AL) vessels are named with the prefix KRI (Kapal Perang Republik Indonesia, or Naval Vessel of the Republic of Indonesia). Smaller sized boats with light armaments usually have the prefix KAL, standing for Indonesia navy ships. The classes are often named after lead ships or the first ship commissioned. 

The Navy consists of frigates, corvettes, submarines, fast attack craft, minesweepers, landing transport ships, support vessels and training ships.

Submarine fleet
The Indonesian Navy is expected to operate at least 8 submarines by 2024. The submarines are named after weapons in Javanese Wayang mythology.

Surface fleet

Frigate 
Frigates are typically named after a National Hero of Indonesia or other Heroes of Indonesia.

Corvette 
Corvettes are typically named after a National Hero of Indonesia or other Heroes of Indonesia, or a navy personnel who was killed in action.

Fast missile boat 
Fast missile boat (FMB) or in Indonesian Kapal Cepat Rudal (KCR) are small vessels that are used in a hit-and-run naval strategy. FMBs are named after traditional weapons of Indonesia.

Patrol fleet
The list below mentions ships that are considered as KRI because they are equipped with heavy and adequate armament or equipment. The Indonesian Navy also has numerous smaller patrol boats that classify as KAL. These types of boats were used as a secondary fleet to maintain the law of Indonesian coastal sea. Most of these smaller boats are lightly armed and better known domestically as PC or Patroli Cepat (Fast Patrol) vessel. There are also even smaller boats with Patkamla (Patroli keamanan laut) prefixes or Marine security patrol and armed with only machine guns. These boats are mainly used to patrol around various TNI AL naval bases or Lanal (Pangkalan TNI AL) across the Indonesian archipelago. Due to the sheer number of Lanal located inside Indonesian territory, TNI AL sources some of its patrol vessels (mostly Patkamla or rarely KAL vessels) from local shipbuilding industry in the region around its bases' location. This resulted in a varied bunch of ship classes and designs based on different standards adopted by various ship builder. Patrol boats are named after fish (Pari class, Sibarau class, Cucut class, etc.), snake (Boa class, Krait class, etc.), and small islands of Indonesia. The list below does not reflect the actual number of patrol vessels used by Indonesian Navy due to various factors, such as insufficient open-source data of some vessels and the lack of coverage by most national or international publications on patrol boats smaller than 18 meters (mostly Patkamla vessel), which are often converted from locally sourced boats near its Lanal location.

Minesweeper Fleet

Mine countermeasure vessel

Transport landing fleet

Hospital Fleet (BRS)

Support fleet

Weapon systems

Future projects

Frigates
In 2019, defence planners from the Indonesian Ministry of Defence (MoD) are increasingly leaning towards a variant of the Iver Huitfeldt-class frigate in their quest to acquire two more frigates for the country's navy.

On April 30, 2020, The Indonesian Ministry of Defence has signed a preamble contract that paves the way for the country to procure Iver Huitfeldt-class frigate from Denmark. The contract was signed in the presence of representatives from the MoD, state-owned shipbuilder PT. PAL, and PT. Sinar Kokoh Persada, the Indonesian agent for Danish company Odense Maritime Technology (OMT).

In July 2020, it was reported that Indonesian Ministry of Defence has indicated an interest in procuring Germany's Bremen-class frigate warships as part of Indonesian Navy (Tentara Nasional Indonesia – Angkatan Laut: TNI-AL) modernization program requirement known as the Interim Readiness Frigate (IRF).

On July 13, 2020, Indonesia's Minister of Defence, Prabowo Subianto, has forwarded a proposal for the country to receive up to $20 billion in defence-related foreign credit and assistance schemes for the period spanning 2020–24. Among programmes that may be funded via the proposed foreign defence credits include two follow-on warships to the Martadinata-class frigate.

According to a statement released by the Indonesian MoD on 31 March 2021, Indonesian state-owned shipbuilder PT. PAL has engaged German naval consultancy group, MTG Marinetechnik, and Turkish engineering firm FIGES AS, to customize the design of a new frigate class that it will be constructing for the Indonesian Navy. Marinetechnik and FIGES are customizing a derivative design of Iver Huitfeldt-class frigate for TNI-AL requirements, and will be recommending a suite of sensors, weapons, and other combat systems for the frigate.

According to The Japan Times and The Japan News, Indonesia plans to import four destroyers and construct four more ships domestically through transfer of technology from Japan. The project is expected to be worth about ¥300 billion and will likely to include the Mogami-class frigate.

On June 10, 2021, Italian shipbuilder Fincantieri announced at their press release that they and Ministry of Defense of Indonesia have signed a contract for the supply of six FREMM frigates, the modernization & sale of two Maestrale-class frigates, and other related logistical support. There may also be collaboration between Fincantieri and PT. PAL shipyard regarding local production on some of the FREMM frigates. The two Maestrale-class will be acquired and modernized by Fincantieri after the ships were retired from the Italian Navy.

On September 16, 2021, during Defense and Security Equipment International (DSEI) 2021 event in London, Babcock said it has secured the first export contract for its Arrowhead 140 (AH140) frigate, which is based on the hull of the Iver Huitfeldt-class frigate, through a design license agreement with PT. PAL Indonesia (Persero). The signing event was held on board HMS Argyll (F231), by David Lockwood, CEO of Babcock and Kaharuddin Djenod, CEO of PT. PAL. The ceremony was witnessed by the Defence Minister of Indonesia, Prabowo Subianto and UK Defence Secretary, Rt Hon Ben Wallace MP. The design license will enable PT. PAL to build two Arrowhead 140 frigates in Indonesia with custom design modifications for the Indonesian Navy. 

Indonesian shipbuilder PT. PAL will implement the Arrowhead 140 design on a prior contract it secured from MoD and related parties on April 30, 2020 for two Iver Huitfeldt class-variant frigates. PT. PAL's public affairs office confirmed that the two-ship contract worth $720 million is officially in force, and work is underway in Surabaya, Indonesia, to prepare for the first build while discussions are still ongoing between PT PAL and Babcock on design modifications that will be undertaken to meet the Indonesian Navy's requirements.

On 23 August 2022, Indonesian Ambassador to Japan, Heri Akhmadi fulfilled an invitation from the Acquisition Technology and Logistics Agency (ATLA), of Japan Ministry of Defense to attend "Boarding Experience" tour of 30FMM (Future Multi Missions) frigate belonging to the Japanese Navy in Nagasaki. This visit was in  response of prior accord between Japan and Indonesia regarding military cooperation agreement to promote security and defense cooperation, including the transfer of defense equipment and technology signed in 2021. 

During IndoDefence Expo & Forum 2022, PT. PAL and HAVELSAN signed an MoU on cooperation in the field of combat systems for frigates. The collaboration with HAVELSAN will focus on providing a Combat Management System (CMS) and integration of weapons to be used on Indonesian Frigates program.

Indonesian state-owned shipbuilder PT. PAL is preparing to start work on the country's first Iver Huitfeldt-class frigate (Arrowhead 140) and will hold a steel-cutting ceremony for the ship in November 2022.

Corvettes 
On March 2020, Indonesia’s defense ministry formally launched the modernization, signing an agreement with lead contractor, PT. Len, and Thales, to upgrade KRI Usman Harun (359) with Thales’s latest-generation TACTICOS Combat Management System, SMART-S Mk2 3D and STIR 1.2 EO Mk2 radars, a Vigile Mk2 ESM, and two new tactical data links – Link Y Mk2 and a tactical data link that will be wholly delivered by PT. Len. Existing weaponry will also be fully integrated, and a new VL MICA surface-to-air missile system added. On December 2021, OSI Maritime Systems (OSI) announced that it has been contracted by PT. Len Industri (Persero), Indonesia, for an Integrated Navigation System featuring the integration of new and legacy navigation sensors, with provisions to connect to the Combat Management System (CMS) for the Mid-Life Modernisation (MLM) of Bung Tomo-Class Multi-Role Light Frigate (MRLF), KRI Usman Harun (359). The modernization of KRI Usman Harun is expected to be completed by the end of 2023. On 22 October 2022, Terma has secured new contracts for Indonesian navy and will provide C-Guard Decoy Launching Systems for one Multi-Role Light Frigate (MRLF).

On 31 August 2021, Terma announced that they have been awarded a contract for the upgrade of existing C-Guard systems with Anti-Submarine Warfare (ASW) capabilities for the Sigma-Class Corvettes of the Indonesian Navy. This C-Guard ASW upgrade program is a follow-on from the previous ASW upgrade contract awarded in 2019 for the same class of ships.

On 9 June 2022, PT. Karimun Anugerah Sejati perform first steel cutting and keel laying for one Korvet Rudal Heli (Missile & Helicopter-carrying Corvette) KRH VVIP-73m for presidential VVIP duty to replace the current KRI Barakuda (633) roles as VVIP ship for presidential transport & accommodation at sea. The KRH VVIP-73m to be delivered by February 2023 and officially christened as KRI Bung Karno (369).

On 4 November 2022, Thales signed a contract with PT. Len to undertake the refurbishment of the integrated mission systems for four Diponegoro-class ships. The contract was signed by Mr. Bobby Rasyidin, President Director for PT. Len Industri and Mr. Erik-Jan Raatgerink, Sales Director, Thales Netherlands during IndoDefence Expo & Forum. The corvettes will be updated with Thales TACTICOS Baseline 2 combat management system (CMS) and Thales Naval Smarter (NS) NS50 radar system.

Fast missile boats
In early 2017, the Indonesian Navy has ordered one FMB-60 / KCR-60 worth IDR 220 billion (~$15 million), this ship was already in active service as KRI Kerambit with the consideration to buy four more vessels of the same class. To fulfill the Minimum Essential Force project, Indonesian Navy hopes to receive at least twenty FMB-60 / KCR-60 vessels by 2024.

On 13 May 2019, Terma was officially awarded the contract for delivery of a complete C-Series Combat Suite for four KCR-60m vessels of the Indonesian Navy. Each of the vessels will include Terma’s C-Flex Combat Management System, SCANTER 4603 X-Band radar, C-Guard Decoy Launching System, C-Fire Electro Optical Fire Control System, and full system integration of shipborne sensors and effectors such as naval guns and missile systems.

On 31 August 2021, Terma announced that they have been awarded a contract to supply a third-party Electronic Support Measures (ESM) systems for six vessels (KCR-60m). A shore station for ESM data processing, storage and dissemination will also be part of the overall system.

On 22 October 2022, Terma has secured new contracts in Indonesia and will provide C-Guard Decoy Launching Systems to the Indonesian Navy for two additional KCR-60m Fast Attack Crafts.

On 2021, PT. Tesco Indomaritim received contract to build water-jet-propelled variant of the KCR-60m fast attack craft (FAC) for the Indonesian Navy. The vessel main propulsion consists of a single fixed pitch propeller and two water-jets, contrasting from the existing KCR-60m vessels (Sampari-class) which instead are each only propelled by two fixed pitch propellers. The vessel was demonstrated for the first time during inauguration of KRI dr. Wahidin Sudirohusodo (991) on 4 November 2022.

During IndoDefence Expo & Forum 2022, HAVELSAN announce that they signed a contract to provide ADVENT Combat Management System (CMS) for three KCR-60m ship produced by PT. Tesco Indomaritim.

Patrol vessels
In 2017, Indonesian Navy will hold an open tender to buy at least two Offshore Patrol Vessels or OPV to strengthen its fleet.

The Indonesian shipyard PT. Caputra Mitra Sejati has started the construction of the first two PC-60m fast patrol boats in February 2020 and is planned that the first boat will be completed in August 2022. The two PC-60m vessels, named KRI Dorang (874) and KRI Bawal (875) were commissioned on August 31, 2022.

On 20 July 2020, Indonesian navy and PT. BTI Indo Tekno signed a contract for the procurement of five MSI-DS Seahawk LW30M A1 30mm weapon system, which will be installed in the PC-40m class patrol boat. The weapon system would be delivered in stages with three units will be installed in 2021 and the remaining two units will be installed in 2022. In 2022, Indonesian navy announced the recipient of the weapon system to be KRI Surik (645) fast attack craft, KRI Pari (849), KRI Sembilang (850), KRI Sidat (851) patrol boats, and KRI Pollux (935) multipurpose research vessel. 

On 26 August 2021, Indonesian shipbuilder PT. Daya Radar Utama (DRU) cut steel for two Offshore Patrol Vessels (OPV) for the Indonesian Navy. On November 2021, the company lays keel for the two OPVs with ceremony at their yard in Bandar Lampung. The vessels are to be fitted with HAVELSAN Advent Combat Management System, Elettronica Radar Electronic Counter-Measures System and Atmaca Anti-Ship Missile.

On 4 March 2022, Indonesian local shipyard PT. Karimun Anugrah Sejati started construction of one PC-60m fast patrol boats for the Indonesian Navy 1st Fleet Command (Koarmada I) to be delivered by August 2023. Another two unit of PC-60m fast patrol boats are planned to be ordered and built by another shipyard.

On 15 March 2022, PT. Palindo Marine Shipyard perform first steel cutting and keel laying for one PC-60m fast patrol boats for the Indonesian Navy 2nd Fleet Command (Koarmada II).

On 3 November 2022, Leonardo announced that their Marlin 40 Independent Line of Sight (ILOS) weapon system has been selected to equip two new Indonesian Navy’s PC-60m fast patrol boats. This follows the procurement in 2021 of the same Marlin 40 systems for two PC-60m vessels.

On 29 November 2022, PT. Citra Shipyard performs first steel cutting and keel laying of two PC-40m and also another two unit of PC-28m for the Indonesian navy to be completed in March and November 2024.

On 9 December 2022, PT. Caputra Mitra Sejati perform first steel cutting and keel laying for another two PC-60m fast patrol boats for the Indonesian Navy.

Landing ship tanks
Kolinlamil said that Indonesian Navy will procure at least six new LSTs to replace the older vessel and strengthen the capability of the Indonesian Navy. All of six new LST's was already in active service as of August 2022.

In 2021, Leonardo announced that their Marlin 40 Independent Line of Sight (ILOS) weapon system has been ordered to equip two of the Indonesian Navy’s Teluk Bintuni-class LSTs.

On 14 October 2022, Larsen & Toubro (L&T) has secured a contract to deliver 40 mm naval gun systems to the Indonesian Navy, the weapon will go onboard one of the Indonesian Navy's Teluk Bintuni-class landing ships and it covers the delivery of two Teevra 40 units. L&T will work with Indonesian defense firm BTI Defence on the contract, and the latter will provide after-sales service for the weapon system while it is operational.

Landing platform docks/Hospital assistance ship
In 2017, Kolinlamil reported that Indonesian Navy will order at least three additional LPD to achieve Minimum Essential Force in 2024. One of three new LPD's already in active service as KRI Semarang (594). One ship has been launched and named as KRI dr. Wahidin Sudirohusodo (991). The last ordered ships has been launched and named as KRI dr. Radjiman Wedyodiningrat (992).

Terma was awarded a contract to supply a SCANTER 6002 radar for the latest Indonesian Navy’s Hospital Assistance Ship (BRS) KRI dr. Radjiman Wedyodiningrat. The radar delivery is planned for June 2021. The award follows a previous contract signed in 2019 to supply a similar radar for KRI dr. Wahidin Soedirohusodo, delivered in January 2021.

Minesweepers
The Indonesian Navy has allocated $215 million to replace its two Pulau Rengat-class minesweepers. In January 2019, Indonesia's Ministry of Defence (MoD) has signed a contract with Abeking & Rasmussen to design and construct two mine countermeasures vessels (MCMVs) for the Indonesian Navy. The 62 meters vessels will be an evolution of the German Navy's Frankenthal-class, and will replace the TNI-AL's ageing fleet of two Pulau Rengat-class MCMVs, both of which were commissioned in March 1988.

Abeking & Rasmussen on October 11, 2022, launch the lead vessel, KRI Pulau Fani (731) during ceremony in Lemwerder, Germany. The Pulau Fani-class MCMVs will each be equipped with two unmanned surface vehicles (USVs), and these will be carried on-deck in the vessel's aft section. The USVs both feature Abeking & Rasmussen's SWATH (Small Waterplane Area Twin Hull) design.

Submarines
In January 2020 the Indonesian Minister of Defence Prabowo Subianto during a bilateral meeting in France and met with his French counterpart Florence Parly said the Ministry is interested on French military equipments including 48 Rafale jet fighters, 4 Scorpène submarines, and 2 Gowind corvettes.

On 10 February 2022 the Indonesian Minister of Defence Prabowo Subianto and his French counterpart Florence Parly witness the signing of Memorandum of Understanding (MoU) between Kaharuddin Djenod, CEO of PT. PAL and Pierre Eric Pommellet, CEO of Naval Group on cooperation in research and development between PT. PAL and Naval Group regarding the plan to purchase two Scorpène submarines with AIP (Air-independent Propulsion) along with weapons and spare parts as well as training with local production of said submarine on PT. PAL facility in Surabaya, East Java.

On 2 November 2022 Naval Group and PT. PAL signed a Memorandum of Understanding to start the creation of an Indonesian Energy Research Lab to cooperate on energy and propulsions solutions in the naval field. This project consists of the creation of the Indonesian Energy Research Lab to develop, in Indonesia, the next generation of submarine energy solutions.

Former ships

Gallery of ships

See also
Equipment of the Indonesian Air Force
Equipment of the Indonesian Army
Military of Indonesia
List of former Indonesian Navy Ships

References
Citations

 Bibliography

Notes 
BRN: British Royal Navy
USN: United States Navy
RNN: Royal Netherlands Navy
GDR: German Democratic Republic Navy (Volksmarine)
RFA: Royal Fleet Auxiliary
FPB: Fast Patrol Boat
LPD: Landing Platform Dock
LST: Landing Ship Tank
LCU: Landing Craft Utility
MPRV: Multi-Purpose Research Vessel
FAC-M: Fast Attack Craft - Missile
FAC-T: Fast Attack Craft - Torpedo
PB: Patrol Boat
RI: Short for Republik Indonesia, a common ship prefixes before being replaced with KRI
Fasharkan: Short for Fasilitas Pemeliharaan dan Perbaikan or Service and Repair Facility owned by the navy

Further reading
Indonesian Navy ships and equipment (Navy Recognition)
GDR Naval transfers from the Unofficial German Navy Homepage, retrieved 16 July 2007
World Navies Today: Indonesia, retrieved 17 July 2007
Kapal Republik Indonesia, retrieved 17 July 2007 
 People's Daily Online -- Indonesian Navy to buy 4 Dutch corvettes - Corvette acquisition

 
Indonesia